Oberkirch railway station, also known as Oberkirch LU railway station, is a railway station in the municipality of Oberkirch, in the Swiss canton of Lucerne. It is an intermediate stop on the standard gauge Olten–Lucerne line of Swiss Federal Railways.

Services 
The following services stop at Oberkirch:

References

External links 
 
 

Railway stations in the canton of Lucerne
Swiss Federal Railways stations